Huslia (in Koyukon) is a city in Yukon-Koyukuk Census Area, Alaska, United States. Rarely known as Hussliakatna, it is inhabited by Koyukuk-hotana Athabascans. The population was 293 at the 2000 census and 275 as of the 2010 census.

Geography
Huslia is located at  (65.701858, -156.387134).

Demographics

Huslia first appeared on the 1950 U.S. Census as the unincorporated village of "Cutoff." The name changed to Huslia beginning with the 1960 census and incorporated as such in 1969.

As of the census of 2000, there were 293 people, 88 households, and 63 families residing in the city. The racial makeup of the city was 4.44% White, 93.52% Native American, 0.34% Pacific Islander, and 1.71% from two or more races. 1.37% of the population were Hispanic or Latino of any race.

There were 88 households, out of which 56.8% had children under the age of 18 living with them, 39.8% were married couples living together, 26.1% had a female householder with no husband present, and 27.3% were non-families. 22.7% of all households were made up of individuals, and 3.4% had someone living alone who was 65 years of age or older. The average household size was 3.33 and the average family size was 3.83.

In the city, the population was spread out, with 43.0% under the age of 18, 8.5% from 18 to 24, 25.9% from 25 to 44, 15.7% from 45 to 64, and 6.8% who were 65 years of age or older. The median age was 24 years. For every 100 females, there were 110.8 males. For every 100 females age 18 and over, there were 108.8 males.

The median income for a household in the city was $27,000, and the median income for a family was $31,000. Males had a median income of $52,500 versus $30,313 for females. The per capita income for the city was $10,983. About 22.9% of families and 28.1% of the population were below the poverty line, including 37.9% of those under the age of eighteen and none of those 65 or over.

Education
The Yukon–Koyukuk School District operates the Jimmy Huntington School in Huslia.

References

External links
 Alaska Division of Community and Regional Affairs: Huslia
 Constitution of the Native Tribe of Huslia, Alaska

Cities in Alaska
Cities in Yukon–Koyukuk Census Area, Alaska